Arthur E. Lund (July 28, 1920 – July 5, 2009) was an American politician in the state of Montana who served in the Montana House of Representatives from 1963 to 1980. He was Speaker pro tempore in 1981.

References

1920 births
2009 deaths
People from Madison County, Montana
University of Montana alumni
Republican Party members of the Montana House of Representatives
20th-century American politicians
People from Scobey, Montana